The discography of singer, Kenji Sawada.

However, refer to the paragraph of "The Tigers" for the work of "The Tigers" and refer to the paragraph of "Pyg" for the work of "Pyg".

Albums

Studio albums

Compilations

Live albums

Others

Singles 

Discographies of Japanese artists
Pop music discographies
Rock music discographies